Beverly Roberts Gaventa is Distinguished Professor of New Testament Interpretation at Baylor University and Helen H.P. Manson Professor of New Testament Literature and Exegesis Emerita at Princeton Theological Seminary.

Biography 
Beverly Roberts Gaventa matriculated at: Phillips University, B.A., 1970; Union Theological Seminary, New York City, M.Div., 1973, studying with Raymond E. Brown and J. Louis Martyn; and Duke University, Ph.D., 1978, with W. D. Davies as her dissertation supervisor.

Gaventa taught at Princeton Theological Seminary (1992–2013), Columbia Theological Seminary (1987–1992), and Colgate Rochester Divinity School (1976–1987) before she joined the Baylor faculty in 2013. 

She was elected president of the Society of Biblical Literature for 2016. She is an editor-at-large for The Christian Century. She is a ruling elder in the Presbyterian Church (USA) and a member of the First Presbyterian Church, Waco, Texas.

Honors 
 Extraordinary Professor, Stellenbosch University, 2004–present
 Member, Center of Theological Inquiry, 2000–2001, 2004–2005
 Doctor of Letters (honoris causa), Christian Theological Seminary, 2002
 Award of Special Merit,  Disciples Theological Digest, 1988 (for Gaventa's book From Darkness to Light, 1986)
 Doctor of Divinity (honoris causa), Kalamazoo College, 1983
 Award for Theological Scholarship and Research, Association of Theological Schools, 1981–82
 A Festschrift, The Unrelenting God: God's Action In Scripture in 2013,  to honor Gaventa.
 Burkitt Medal for Biblical Studies, British Academy, 2020

Selected works

Books
 
 
 
 
 
 
  - forthcoming

Articles and chapters

Edited volumes

Notes

External links 
 2014, November 6. Beverly Roberts Gaventa | Biblical Studies Online, 28th Carmichael-Walling Lectures at Abilene Christian University. Links to 2 videos:   "God's Outsized Faithfulness to Israel: Thinking Again about Romans 9-11"   "Questions about Torah, Answers about Christ: A Strange Silence in Romans 9-11 (esp. Rom 10:4)"
 2012, March 17. "Beverly Roberts Gaventa 'Listening to Romans with Junia and Her Sisters'", United Theological Seminary of the Twin Cities

Living people
American biblical scholars
New Testament scholars
American theologians
Baylor University faculty
Princeton Theological Seminary faculty
Union Theological Seminary (New York City) alumni
Phillips University alumni
Union Theological Seminary (New York City) faculty
Duke University alumni
American Presbyterians
Year of birth missing (living people)
Place of birth missing (living people)
Female biblical scholars